Navy League of New Zealand is a maritime organisation established in 1896 in New Zealand.

Navy League of New Zealand Branches

As of 2012 there are five constituent branches of Navy League of New Zealand:
Navy League Northland
Navy League Auckland
Navy League Wellington
Navy League Nelson
Navy League Canterbury

Purpose & Objects

The Navy League in New Zealand has a number of general goals or objectives. The primary one is the support and development of the Sea Cadet Corps.

Activities

Navy League Auckland
The Auckland Navy League branch supports and funds a regatta (known as The Navy League Regatta) for the four Auckland Sea Cadet Units (TS Achilles (Central City), TS Bellona (Hobsonville), TS Gambia (Otahuhu), and TS Leander (Devonport) ).

Navy League Canterbury
The John Pallot Memorial Scholarship was established to recognise a sea cadet in the Christchurch/Canterbury area between 16 and 18 years who has made a significant contribution to their unit and demonstrates leadership potential.
The Navy League Canterbury Prize in Diplomacy & International Relations is an award to the top student in the BA (Hons) programme in Diplomacy & International Relations at the University of Canterbury.

Navy League of New Zealand Special Service Medal

The Navy League Special Service Medal is awarded by the National Executive for long or exceptional service to the Navy League movement in New Zealand.

Notable Navy League of New Zealand Members

Navy League Canterbury
George Laurenson
Phineas Selig

See also

Sea Cadet Corps
New Zealand Sea Cadet Corps
Sea Cadet Association of New Zealand

Navy Leagues
Navy League of Australia
Navy League of the United States
Navy League of Canada

Events
Trafalgar Day

External links

Navy League Canterbury
Navy League Canterbury Archives, Macmillan Brown Library, University of Canterbury, Christchurch
Navy League Canterbury Submission to the 2009 Defence Review no. 172. Released under Official Information Act (OIA)
Navy League Canterbury early involvement in Sea Cadet Corps from NZDF Website
Navy League Canterbury Prize for Diplomacy & International Relations. BA(Hons) Programme, University of Canterbury, Christchurch
Navy League Canterbury Cup for Flying Dutchman Championship. Canterbury Yachting Association Website

New Zealand Cadet Forces